Akkur Thanthondreeswarar Temple(ஆக்கூர் தான்தோன்றீசுவரர் கோயில்
]) is a Hindu temple located at Akkur in Mayiladuthurai district of Tamil Nadu, India.  The presiding deity is Shiva. He is called as Thanthondriappar. His consort is known as Valnedunkanni.

Significance 
It is one of the shrines of the 275 Paadal Petra Sthalams - Shiva Sthalams glorified in the early medieval Tevaram poems by Tamil Saivite Nayanars Tirugnanasambandar and Tirunavukkarasar.

Literary mention 
Tirugnanasambandar describes the feature of the deity as:

Sirappuli Nayanar 
Sirappuli Nayanar is associated with this temple. A shrine is dedicated to him, in the temple.

References

External links 
 
 

Shiva temples in Mayiladuthurai district
Padal Petra Stalam